Rodrigo Nunes de Oliveira (born January 11, 1979) is a former Brazilian football player.

Club statistics

References

External links

1979 births
Living people
Brazilian footballers
Brazilian expatriate footballers
Expatriate footballers in Japan
J2 League players
Vegalta Sendai players
Association football forwards